Pellasimnia angasi, common name Angas's volva, is a species of sea snail, a marine gastropod mollusk in the family Ovulidae, the ovulids, cowry allies or false cowries.

Description
The size of an adult shell varies between 10 mm and 38 mm.

Distribution
This species occurs in the Pacific Ocean off Japan and Australia.

References

  Schilder, F.A., 1932. The living species of Amphiperatinae. Proceedings of the Malacological Society of London 20 (1): 46–64
 Cate, C. N. 1973. A systematic revision of the recent Cypraeid family Ovulidae. Veliger 15 (supplement): 1–117
 Lorenz F. & Fehse D. (2009) The living Ovulidae. A manual of the families of allied cowries: Ovulidae, Pediculariidae and Eocypraeidae. Hackenheim: Conchbooks.

External links
 

Ovulidae
Gastropods described in 1865